The Waterbury Dam was built between 1935-1938 by 2,000 men working for the Corps of Engineers, United States Army, to serve as one of three dams to control the flow of Little River, Vermont, Winooski River and its tributaries. In 1927, flood waters from the Winooski River killed over 55 people and caused an estimated $13,000,000 in damage. Along with flood control, the dam also generates electric energy, generating an average of  annually.

The rocks, which serve as the dam's walls, were hand placed during the dam's original construction in 1938. The dam was modified in 1957 and 1958 to provide for increased security.

The dam and the reservoir it creates, the Waterbury Reservoir, are located in the town of Waterbury in northwestern Washington County.

Media

External links

U.S. Corps of Engineers Waterbury Dam, Waterbury, Vermont, Dam Safety Assurance Program. Fact Sheet
An Historic Look at the Damming of the Winooski River Watershed presentation including the Waterbury Dam

Dams in Vermont
Hydroelectric power plants in Vermont
United States Army Corps of Engineers dams
Dams completed in 1938
Energy infrastructure completed in 1938
Buildings and structures in Waterbury, Vermont
1938 establishments in Vermont